Chantemerle is a commune in the Marne department in north-eastern France.
Chantemerle may also refer to:

Places

 Chantemerle-les-Blés, commune in the Drôme department in southeastern France
 Chantemerle-lès-Grignan, commune in the Drôme department in southeastern France
 Chantemerle-sur-la-Soie, commune in the Charente-Maritime department in the Nouvelle-Aquitaine region in southwestern France

People

 Louis de Chantemerle (1818–1893), French magistrate who was Senator of Allier from 1876 to 1885

Other

 Château de Chantemerle, ruined castle in the commune of La Bâthie in the Savoie département of France